Inglefield (also Sandersville) is a neighborhood within the northeastern part of the town of Darmstadt, Indiana, the second-largest incorporated place in Vanderburgh County, Indiana, just north of Evansville along U.S. Route 41.

History

The Inglefield post office has been in operation since 1869.

Geography
Inglefield is located at  (38.1080988, -87.5589070), with an elevation of 472 feet (144 m).

Climate
The climate in this area is characterized by hot, humid summers and generally mild to cool winters.  According to the Köppen Climate Classification system, Inglefield has a humid subtropical climate, abbreviated "Cfa" on climate maps.

References

Unincorporated communities in Vanderburgh County, Indiana
Neighborhoods in Indiana
Unincorporated communities in Indiana